Decker Towers is an 11-floor apartment building at 230 St. Paul Street in Burlington, Vermont. It is the shortest of any of the US states' tallest buildings, in part because Burlington is the smallest of the US states' biggest cities. Decker Towers was built as a turnkey project. After Pizzagalli Construction Company built it in October 29, 1970-August 31, 1971, the city of Burlington purchased it. It is owned and managed as public housing by the Burlington Housing Authority. Its assessed value is $11,104,000, with the building, land, and yard items valued at $10,224,700; $712,900; and $166,400, respectively.

Features
Decker Towers has a small community garden. Decker Towers has 161 apartments for seniors and people with disabilities. The apartments are either one bedroom or efficiency apartments; six apartments are wheelchair accessible. There is also a dining area, a library, and an 11th floor sitting area. The tenant organization hosts monthly dinners, holiday events and bingo.

The Burlington Housing Authority's Neighborhood Networks Technology Center is located within Decker Towers. It has computers for use by all residents of subsidized housing in the Burlington area.

History
When it opened on August 31, 1971, Decker Towers was called 230 St. Paul Street (its official address then and now). It was the fourth property owned by the Burlington Housing Authority. It was built on top of the old Burlington ravine sewer route.

In late 1971, the administrative offices of the Burlington Housing Authority were moved to the first floor of 230 St. Paul Street. The offices were there until July 2002.

Renovations

Decker Towers was built with an orange brick exterior. In 1984, exterior insulation was added over the brick as well as pastel swatches designed by Rolf Kielman.

Prior to 2010, the building's exterior had degraded: there were cracks, moisture in the insulation, and window seals were no longer fully functional.

In 2009, money from the American Recovery and Reinvestment Act of 2009 was used at Decker Towers to replace hallway floors as well as resurface the parking lot. Additional funding for renovations also came from Capital Fund Grants.

Other renovations included weatherproofing, a thorough power-wash, reinforcement of stucco, application of a waterproof membrane, a fiberglass mesh layer, and new caulk. The dust barriers were also replaced.

Decker Towers was fully occupied and functioning during the renovations. The project was finished ahead of schedule.

Smoking policy
Decker Towers caught on fire on February 17, 2010, due to careless smoking. Water from the building's fire sprinkler system caused $100,000 in damage.

Decker Towers are smoke-free as of November 1, 2010. The new policy was encouraged by the U.S. Department of Housing and Urban Development. The change was motivated by concerns about the effects of second-hand smoke and by safety concerns. The policy will require resident smokers to leave the property, and violating the policy will result in terminating tenancy. Smoking cessation programs were made available at little to no cost.

See also
 List of tallest buildings by U.S. state
 List of tallest buildings in Vermont

Notes

References

Works cited
Chittenden Country Historical Society, Historic Guide to Burlington Neighborhoods (vol. 1).

Buildings and structures in Burlington, Vermont
Public housing in the United States
Apartment buildings in Vermont
Residential buildings completed in 1971
1971 establishments in Vermont